Crazy Legs Conti: Zen And The Art Of Competitive Eating is a 2004 documentary film portraying the culture of competitive eating.  It was directed by Danielle Franco and Christopher Kenneally.

The film follows Jason "Crazy Legs" Conti, an eccentric New York window washer, nude model and sperm donor. He begins as a huge fan of the annual July 4 hot dog eating competition, but then casually breaks the world oyster eating record in New Orleans. He proceeds to dedicate himself to fulfilling his lifelong dream of becoming a professional competitive eater.

External links 
 
 Film Website
Photos from the TripRewards 2007 Ultimate Hotwing Eating Contest

2004 films
Competitive eating
American sports documentary films
2004 documentary films
2000s English-language films
2000s American films
English-language documentary films